West Coast Wailers is an album by American jazz trumpeter Conte Candoli and pianist Lou Levy released on the Atlantic label in 1958.

Reception

Allmusic noted "no matter whose name is in large print on the cover, it's the group that's performing ...Levy and Candoli got to make their statements up front, of course, but this was really a five-headed beast ...one that should have been given more of a hearing than just one album".

Track listing 
 "Lover, Come Back to Me" (Sigmund Romberg, Oscar Hammerstein II) - 8:15
 "Comes Love" (Sam H. Stept, Lew Brown, Charles Tobias) - 4:15
 "Lover Man" (Jimmy Davis, Ram Ramirez, James Sherman) - 3:36
 "Pete's Alibi" (Pete Candoli) - 3:26
 "Cheremoya" (Bill Holman) - 5:50
 "Jordu" (Duke Jordan) - 4:56
 "Flamingo" (Ted Grouya, Edmund Anderson) - 5:23
 "Marcia Lee" (Conte Candoli) - 4:51

Personnel 
Conte Candoli - trumpet
Lou Levy - piano
Bill Holman - tenor saxophone 
Leroy Vinnegar - bass 
Lawrence Marable - drums

References 

Conte Candoli albums
Lou Levy (pianist) albums
1956 albums
Atlantic Records albums
Albums produced by Ahmet Ertegun